Athara Hazari , is a city and capital of 18-Hazari Tehsil situated on the Jhang-Bakhar Highway within the boundaries of the Jhang District, Punjab, Pakistan. It is about 7 kilometers from the Trimmu Barrage. To the north of the town, the rivers Jhelum and Chenab meet and the water flows down to the Trimmu Barrage. There is a central mosque; Mufti Sajjad Ahmad is the Khateeb of this mosque.

References 

Jhang District
Populated places in Jhang District
Cities in Punjab (Pakistan)